BMS-470539 is a small-molecule experimental drug which acts as a potent and highly selective full agonist of the MC1 receptor. It was discovered in 2003 as part of an effort to understand the role of the MC1 receptor in immunomodulation, and has since been used in scientific research to determine its role in inflammatory processes. The compound was designed with the intention of mimicking the central His-Phe-Arg-Trp pharmacophore of the melanocortins, and this proved to be successful based on its favorable pharmacodynamic profile.

See also
 Afamelanotide
 Bremelanotide
 Melanotan II
 Modimelanotide
 Setmelanotide

References

Carboxamides
Anti-inflammatory agents
Imidazoles
Immunomodulating drugs
Melanocortin receptor agonists
4-Phenylpiperidines